Thomas Irving Morey (6 February 1906 – 11 December 1980) was an Australian politician, elected from 1962 to 1965 as a member of the New South Wales Legislative Assembly, for the electoral district of Bligh. He was a member of the Labor Party.

Notes

|-

1906 births
1980 deaths
Members of the New South Wales Legislative Assembly
Australian Labor Party members of the Parliament of New South Wales
People from Armidale
20th-century Australian politicians
Councillors of Sydney County Council